Whatever You Want may refer to:

Music
 Whatever You Want (album), a 1979 album by the British band Status Quo
 Whatever You Want – The Very Best of Status Quo, 1997 compilation album by the British band Status Quo
 "Whatever You Want" (Pink song), 2017.
 "Whatever You Want" (Status Quo song), 1979.
 "Whatever You Want" (Tina Turner song), 1996.
 "Whatever You Want" (Tony! Toni! Toné! song), 1991.
 "Whatever You Want", a single from the album Beautiful Sharks by Something for Kate, 1999.
 "Whatever You Want" by Crowded House, 2020

Other uses
 Whatever You Want, RPM Productions TV show with Keith Allen (actor) 1982
 Whatever You Want, Hat Trick Productions show with Gaby Roslin 1997

See also
 "Whatever U Want", a 2004 song by Christina Milian
 "Whatever U Want" (Consequence song), 2009
"Whatever U Want", a song by Weki Meki from the 2019 album Lock End LOL